Fredrick Azeem is a Pakistani politician hailing from Peshawar, who is a former member of the Khyber Pakhtunkhwa Assembly, belonging to the Pakistan Muslim League (N). He is also serving as member of different committees.

Political career
Azeem was elected as the member of the Khyber Pakhtunkhwa Assembly on ticket of Pakistan Muslim League (N) from Constituency MR-3 in 2013 Pakistani general election.

References

Living people
Pashtun people
Khyber Pakhtunkhwa MPAs 2013–2018
People from Peshawar
Pakistan Muslim League (N) politicians
Pakistani Christians
Year of birth missing (living people)